Airespace, Inc., formerly Black Storm Networks, was a networking hardware company founded in 2001, manufacturing wireless access points and Controllers. The company developed the AP-Controller model for fast deployment and the Lightweight Access Point Protocol, the precursor to the CAPWAP protocol.

Corporate history 
Airespace was founded in 2001 by Pat Calhoun, Bob Friday, Bob O'Hara, and Ajay Mishra. The company was venture backed by Storm Ventures, Norwest Venture Partners and Battery Ventures. In 2003, it entered into an agreement to provide OEM equipment to NEC. In 2004 it signed an agreement with Alcatel and Nortel to provide equipment to the two companies on an OEM basis.

Airespace was first to market with integrated location tracking. Within a year and a half, the company grew rapidly into the market leader of enterprise Wi-Fi.

Cisco Systems acquired Airespace in 2005 for $450 million; this was one of 13 acquisitions Cisco made that year and the largest up to that point. Airespace products were merged into Cisco Aironet product line.

References

2001 establishments in California
2005 disestablishments in California
2005 mergers and acquisitions
American companies established in 2001
American companies disestablished in 2005
Cisco Systems acquisitions
Computer companies established in 2001
Computer companies disestablished in 2005
Defunct computer companies of the United States
Defunct computer hardware companies
Defunct networking companies
Networking hardware companies